Timothy Carvelle Gordon (born May 7, 1965) is a former professional American football player who played Safety for six seasons for the Atlanta Falcons and the New England Patriots in the National Football League.

1965 births
Living people
People from Ardmore, Oklahoma
Players of American football from Oklahoma
American football cornerbacks
Tulsa Golden Hurricane football players
Atlanta Falcons players
New England Patriots players